Miriam "Mimi" Lurie Haas (born 1946) is an American billionaire businesswoman. She is the widow of Peter E. Haas, who was the great-grandnephew of Levi Strauss, the founder of denim manufacturer Levi Strauss & Co.

Early life
She was born Miriam Ruchwarger in 1946 in New Jersey, the daughter of Nancy (née Zdenka) and Avram Ruchwarger, Jewish refugees from Yugoslavia. She was raised in Annapolis, Maryland and then in the Washington D.C. suburbs where her father was a psychiatrist. She attended Oxon Hill High School, in Oxon Hill, a suburb of Washington, DC, and graduated in the class of 1964. She earned a degree in political science from George Washington University.

Career
Haas is president of the Miriam and Peter Haas Fund, since August 1981.

In July 2004, Haas was elected as a director of Levi Strauss & Co, succeeding her husband, who stood down as chairman emeritus.

Haas is vice chair of the board of trustees and chair of the committee on painting and sculpture of the New York Museum of Modern Art, and vice chair of the San Francisco Museum of Modern Art.

Haas owns 16.7% of Levi Strauss & Co, making her a billionaire, following the February 2019 plan for the company to be publicly traded on the New York Stock Exchange.

Personal life
On June 12, 1968, she married Brian Lurie, who she had met in Israel when on an American Friends of the Hebrew University program. Rabbi Brian Lurie was head of the Jewish Community Federation for many years, and now runs the progressive New Israel Foundation. They had two sons, Ari Lurie and Daniel Lurie, who runs Tipping Point Community.

She was married to Peter E. Haas (his second marriage) from 1981 until his death in 2005.

She lives in San Francisco.

In 2010, she bought one of the apartments owned by Charles R. Schwab at 834 Fifth Avenue, New York, for $12.5 million.

References

Living people
1946 births
American billionaires
20th-century American Jews
Female billionaires
Haas family
People from Oxon Hill, Maryland
21st-century American Jews